Gymnosoma emdeni is a Palaearctic species of fly in the family Tachinidae.

Distribution
Zimbabwe, Ethiopia, Kenya, Tanzania, Uganda.

References

Phasiinae
Diptera of Africa
Insects described in 1950